Fred or Frederic(k) Kelly may refer to:

 Frederic Festus Kelly (died 1883), founder of Kelly's Directories, Ltd.
 Fred Kelly (footballer) (1877–?), Welsh footballer
 Frederick Septimus Kelly (1881–1916), Australian and British musician, composer and rower
 Fred C. Kelly (1882–1959), American humorist, newspaperman, columnist and author
 Fred Kelly (ice hockey) (1887/1888–1974), Canadian amateur and professional ice hockey player
 J. Frederick Kelly (1888–1947), American architect
 Fred Kelly (athlete) (1891–1974), American athlete
 Fred Norbert Kelly (1916–2000), American choreographer, dancer, actor and director
 Fred Kelly (comics) (1921–2005), Canadian creator of comic books during the 1940s
 Fred Kelly (cross-country skier) (born 1952), Canadian former cross-country skier